The women's team classification tennis event at the 2019 Summer Universiade was held between 5 and 13 July 2019 at the Circolo Tennis and Lungomare in Naples, Italy.

Ranking system 

The following chart shows that the points earned by each placing in the events:

If the scores are tied, the ranking will be determined by the following steps:
Medal counts 
Gold medal counts

Results

Individual ranking

Nation ranking

References 
 Universiade 2019 Website
  Team Classification

Women's team classification